Elizabeth Fraser (born 7 April 1941) is an Australian former swimmer. She competed in the women's 4 × 100 metre freestyle relay at the 1956 Summer Olympics.

References

External links
 

1941 births
Living people
Olympic swimmers of Australia
Swimmers at the 1956 Summer Olympics
Place of birth missing (living people)
Australian female freestyle swimmers